Lucas Algozino (born 29 September 1995) is an Argentine footballer who plays for Brown de Adrogué.

References

Argentine footballers
1995 births
Living people
Unión de Santa Fe footballers
Guillermo Brown footballers
Sportivo Belgrano footballers
Club Atlético Alvarado players
Independiente Rivadavia footballers
Club Atlético Brown footballers
Argentine Primera División players
Primera Nacional players
Torneo Federal A players
Association football midfielders
Footballers from Santa Fe, Argentina